Khasanbi Taov (born November 5, 1977) is a Russian judoka.

He won a bronze medal in the middleweight (90 kg) division at the 2004 Summer Olympics.

Achievements

References

External links
 
 Videos of Khasanbi Taov (judovision.org)

1977 births
Living people
Russian male judoka
Judoka at the 2004 Summer Olympics
Olympic judoka of Russia
Olympic bronze medalists for Russia
Olympic medalists in judo
Medalists at the 2004 Summer Olympics
Sportspeople from Kabardino-Balkaria